The 1993 Nehru Cup was held in Madras at the Jawaharlal Nehru Stadium. This was the 10th edition of the Nehru Cup. The participating teams were North Korea, Russia, Finland, Bolivia, Cameroon, and India. North Korea won the cup, but the
Man of the Tournament was India's Vijayan.

Group A

Note: none of the matches in this group are full A-internationals

Group B

Knock-out stage

Semi-finals

Final

Winners

Statistics

Goalscorers

References

Nehru Cup
1993 in Asian football
1992–93 in Indian football